Every Red Heart Shines Toward the Red Sun is the second studio album by post-rock band Red Sparowes, released in September 2006.

Despite having no lyrics, the album (by way of its song titles) follows the story of the Great Leap Forward in Mao Zedong-era China, more specifically recounting the Great Sparrow Campaign, a mass killing of sparrows (along with rats, flies and mosquitoes) that fed on a portion of the harvest and were seen as pests. Peasants were encouraged to bang pots and pans to scare sparrows into continuing flight, eventually killing them from exhaustion. Whilst the harvest of the year after the campaign was larger, there was a massive rise in locust numbers in the late 1950s, as a result of the significantly lower population of sparrows, a major predator of the locust.

Along with other programs in the Great Leap Forward, the Great Sparrow Campaign caused widespread famine where, between 1959 and 1962, 45 million people died of starvation or were beaten to death.

Track listing

Bonus Tracks

Personnel 
 Tim Green – audio engineering, audio mixing and production
 Greg Burns – bass guitar, pedal steel
 David Clifford – drums
 Josh Graham – guitar, keyboard
 Bryant Clifford Meyer – guitar, organ, piano
 Andy Arahood – guitar

References

2006 albums
Concept albums
Post-rock albums by American artists
Red Sparowes albums